Niki – Rock 'n' Ball is a game produced by Austrian studio Bplus for the WiiWare. The game runs on 2.5D graphics.

Plot
The game is set in the far future. In one planetary system all the living creatures have been transformed into balls and attacked by the monsters. Players take control of Niki, who has been turned into a ball and attempt to stand up against the monsters to protect his village. When Niki comes across a mysterious ZeLeLi amulet, which gives him the ability to change into a hard rock, giving him the ability to defeat the monsters. Players must help Niki chase away all the monsters before they become too overwhelming in number and take over his village.

Development

Reception

The game received "generally unfavorable" reviews, according to video game review aggregator Metacritic. IGN criticized its controls, art style, and general game concept. GameSpot concurred.

References

2008 video games
Action video games
Video games developed in Austria
Wii-only games
WiiWare games
Wii games